Minnesota's Twin Cities region is home to a large community of Wiccans, Witches, Druids, Heathens, and a number of Pagan organizations.  Some neopagans in the USA refer to the area as Paganistan,  a term coined by linguist, poet, and humorist Steven Posch in 1989, which he then used in the title of his spoken word album Radio Paganistan : Folktales of the Urban Witches.

History
In 1961, Llewellyn Worldwide, an independent publisher of books for the New Age, Pagan, and occult audience was moved to Saint Paul by the new owner Carl L. Weschcke. At the time they were simply an astrological publisher.

In 1963 Carleton College in nearby Northfield, Minnesota, established a rule that students had to attend religious services of some kind. The RDNA (Reformed Druids of North America) formed in response and they continued to meet even after the rule was rescinded.

In 1971, Llewellyn hosted the "First American Aquarian Festival of Astrology and the Occult Sciences" which went on to be known as Gnosticon. Llewellyn's publications and Gnosticon drew more attention to Witchcraft, contemporary Paganism, and their connection to the Twin Cities. This led to the creation of the American Council of Witches in late 1973 and the Council Convened at the Great American Witchmeet in 1974.

In 1975, Burtrand and Aura, initiates of the Weschckes via Lady Sheba, founded the Minnesota Church of Wicca.

In 1979 Louie Piper opened Evenstar Books. This metaphysical shop became a center of Pagan activities which lasted for almost 30 years, and is the direct predecessor of the Sacred Paths Center.

Northern Dawn Local Council of the Covenant of the Goddess was founded in 1982 by Church of the Earth and Rowan Tree. NorDCoG hosted public sabbats from Samhain of 1982 until April 2016 at which time they disbanded. It had hosted the CoG national gathering (Merrymeet) twice.

In 1987 the Druid group called "Keltria" was formed when Tony Taylor initiated a schism from Isaac Bonewits' ADF.

The Minneapolis daily newspaper Star Tribune edition of Saturday, October 31, 1992 had an article called "Witches and pagans gather for a special New Year's Eve..." which included the phrase, "The Twin Cities may have one of the largest pagan populations in the United States, so large that one member calls Minneapolis and St. Paul.

Monday, May 23, 1994 in an unusual non-Halloween Star Tribune article titled “Pagans seek respect and a place to call their own - Religion is legitimate, has spiritual base, followers say” the paper is quoted "They estimate that there are 3,000 to 10,000 Pagans in Minnesota, one of the largest concentrations in the country. They call this area ‘Paganistan’ in honor of the Pagans. "

The first Coffee Cauldron was held in 1995. This was a monthly, then semi-monthly gathering of Pagans that now stands as the longest running regular gathering in Paganistan.

The New Alexandria Library opened in 2000 as a subscription library. It was founded by members of the Wiccan Church of Minnesota. Its stated purpose was "to create an archive that preserves our Pagan history, culture, and heritage, to ensure community access to hard-to-find and out-of-print materials, to provide access to a wide range of information and training materials, and to serve as a center of studies and research for scholars of  Neo-Paganism." Citing financial reasons, the library closed its doors in June 2004.

During the fight for Pagan veterans' rights against the Veterans Administration, a nationally-publicized rally and ritual took place at the Minnesota State Capitol Mall on February 24, 2007. The rally and ritual were organized by the Upper Midwest Pagan Alliance.

The Sacred Paths Center, which opened March 13, 2009, was at the time the only full-time non-profit Pagan community center in the United States. Unfortunately, it closed its doors in early 2012, amid allegations of financial malfeasance. The Upper Midwest Pagan Alliance, formed to fight for Pagan civil rights during the "pentacle quest," adopted a stretch of highway in 2008 which Pagan volunteers kept clean. The first bureau for the Pagan Newswire Collective was formed in Paganistan.

On April 9, 2011 the Star Tribune was quoted: "The Twin Cities metro area -- dubbed "Paganistan" by Wiccans for having one of the highest witch concentrations in the country—has an estimated 20,000 witches who meet in 236 different covens or groups..." in an article about a Wiccan prisoner suing the State for his religious freedom.

In 2020, the Asatru Folk Assembly opened a Baldurshof in Murdock, a heathen hof dedicated to the god Baldur. Baldurshof is a 120-year old former church located on the main street of this tiny prairie town.

Research of Minnesotan paganism
As one of five larger population concentrations of pagans in the United States (the other four being San Francisco, New Orleans, New York City and Salem, Massachusetts) , the Minnesotan Pagan community is the subject of a thesis by Doctor of Anthropology Murphy Pizza. In her book Handbook of Contemporary Paganism, Dr. Pizza characterizes the Minnesota Pagan community as "eclectic" and comprising "many different groups - Druid orders, Witch covens, legal Pagan churches, Ethnic Reconstructionist groups, and many more solitaries, interlopers and poly-affiliated Pagans [...]".

See also

 Neopaganism in the United States
 Religions of the Twin Cities
 Minneapolis, Minnesota
 Saint Paul, Minnesota

References

Minnesota
Minneapolis–Saint Paul
Religion in Minnesota